Vala, originally spelt Valla, is a closed halt on the Algarve line in the Silves municipality, Portugal. It is part of the section from Silves to Ferragudo, which opened on the 15th of February 1903.

References

Railway stations in Portugal
Railway stations opened in 1903